Asset recovery, also known as investment or resource recovery, is the process of maximizing the value of unused or end-of-life assets through effective reuse or divestment. While sometimes referred to in the context of a company undergoing liquidation, Asset recovery also can describe the process of liquidating excess inventory, refurbished items, and equipment returned at the end of a lease.

Asset recovery can also refer to the task of recovery of assets that have been wrongfully taken either stolen, fraudulently misappropriated or otherwise disposed of to remove them from their rightful owner.

Asset recovery has three main elements—identification, redeployment, and divestment. Specialized asset recovery software may assist any of these steps.

Identification

Because unproductive assets cost money, it is important to classify them as such by investment recovery personnel. Later, a decision can be made whether to redeploy or divest. Surplus assets could be in any form, including fixed equipment, mobile equipment, buildings, or land. Idle or surplus assets can be either capital assets or non-capital surplus.

Redeployment

Redeploying an idle asset to another part of an organization is often the most productive use for the asset. Asset redeployment also saves the organization money by eliminating the need to purchase a new asset at current market rates. For effective reuse, another part of the company needs to require an asset of that kind. It must also be practical to transfer and deploy the asset at the new location.

One form of internal redeployment is cannibalization of usable spare parts from one asset to another. For example, a taxicab company has two non-running cabs with different non-working parts in each. By taking a working part from one non-running cab and placing it in the other, the company has reduced its number of non-running cabs by 50%.

Disposition

Disposition of surplus or idle assets is the process of either selling, scrapping, recycling, donating, or disposing an asset. The process involves removing the asset from an organization's books. When this is done effectively, the organization obtains capital that can be placed back into the business. In addition, a good asset sale produces revenue and boosts profits. Donations also build goodwill and deliver tax benefits. The type of disposition method employed will depend on the type of asset, its fair value, and market demand.

References

Asset